A referendum on the electoral system was held in Andorra on 28 May 1982.

Background
In December 1980, the Co-Princes agreed on reforms, including the establishment of an Executive Council and the holding of a referendum on the voting system. Voters were offered the options of a majority system, a proportional system (in which the parishes would serve as constituencies), or a mixed system, with candidates elected using the majority system at the national level and the proportional system in the parishes.

Results

References

Andorra
1982 in Andorra
Referendums in Andorra
Electoral reform referendums
Electoral reform in Andorra
May 1982 events in Europe
Multiple-choice referendums